Rodney McLeod Jr. (born June 23, 1990) is an American football safety who is a free agent. McLeod played college football at Virginia and signed with the St. Louis Rams as an undrafted free agent in 2012. He has also played for the Philadelphia Eagles, and won a Super Bowl with them in 2017.

High school career 
McLeod attended DeMatha Catholic High School in Hyattsville, Maryland where he played as a safety.

Considered a three-star recruit by 247Sports.com, he chose Virginia over Syracuse and Virginia Tech.

College career
McLeod played college football for Virginia. He finished all four years with 190 tackles, six interceptions, one sack, 17 pass deflections, and three forced fumbles.

Professional career

St. Louis Rams
On April 30, 2012, the St. Louis Rams signed McLeod to a three-year, $1.44 million contract after he went undrafted during the 2012 NFL Draft.

2012
Throughout training camp, McLeod competed for a roster spot as a backup safety against Matt Daniels and Quinton Pointer. He progressed quickly and earned an opportunity to show his athleticism after Daniels missed the majority of camp with an injury. McLeod's quick rise up the depth chart continued in the preseason after he led the Rams with 12 combined tackles and earned reps ahead of Darian Stewart at strong safety during practice. Head coach Jeff Fisher named McLeod the backup free safety behind Quintin Mikell to begin the regular season.

He made his professional regular season debut in the St. Louis Rams' season-opener at the Detroit Lions and recorded two solo tackles in their  27–23 loss. McLeod's first career tackle was on Lions' running back Stefan Logan after Logan returned a kick for 13-yards. On November 11, 2012, he tied his season-high of two solo tackles in the Rams' 24–24 tie at the San Francisco 49ers. During this game he caught his only offensive pass on a fake punt for 21 yards. McLeod also led the Rams with 16 special teams tackles as a rookie.

2013
McLeod entered training camp competing for a job as a starting safety after Quintin Mikell was released and Craig Dahl departed in free agency. He competed against Darian Stewart, Matt Daniels, and Matt Giordano. Head coach Jeff Fisher named McLeod the starting strong safety after Darian Stewart missed the preseason and first three games due to a soft tissue injury.

He made his first career start in the St. Louis Rams' season-opener against the Arizona Cardinals and collected five combined tackles in their 27–24 victory. The following week, he collected a season-high seven solo tackles during a 31–24 loss at the Atlanta Falcons. On November 3, 2013, McLeod registered seven combined tackles, broke up a pass, and made the first interception of his career off a pass attempt by quarterback Jake Locker during the Rams' 28–21 loss to the Tennessee Titans. On December 15, 2013, he made a season-high eight combined tackles 
in the Rams' 27–16 loss to the New Orleans Saints. He finished his first season as a starter with 79 combined tackles (63 solo), seven pass deflections, and two interceptions in 16 games and 16 starts. McLeod started the first ten games at both free safety and strong safety  as a replacement for the injured T.J. McDonald and Darian Stewart, but officially earned the starting role over Stewart in Week 12.

2014

New St. Louis Rams' defensive coordinator Gregg Williams named McLeod the starting free safety, along with T. J. McDonald, after Darian Stewart departed for the Baltimore Ravens. He started the St. Louis Rams' season-opener against the Minnesota Vikings and collected a season-high seven combined tackles in their 34–6 loss. The following week, McLeod made five solo tackles and intercepted a pass by quarterback Jameis Winston in the Rams' 19–17 win at the Tampa Bay Buccaneers. He finished the  season with 72 combined tackles (62 solo), six pass deflections, and two interceptions in 16 games and 16 starts.

2015
McLeod became a restricted free agent after the 2014 season after completing his three-year rookie contract. On March 6, 2015, the St. Louis Rams placed a second round tender offer on McLeod that amounted to a one-year, $2.35 million contract.

Head coach Jeff Fisher retained McDonald and McLeod as the starting safety duo to begin the 2015 regular season. McLeod started the St. Louis Rams' season-opener against the Seattle Seahawks and collected six combined tackles in their 34–31 victory. In Week 7, against the Cleveland Browns, he had his first professional touchdown on a 20-yard fumble return. In Week 11, McLeod recorded a season-high nine combined tackles, broke up a pass, forced a fumble, and intercepted a pass attempt by Joe Flacco in the Rams' 16–13 loss at the Baltimore Ravens. In his last season with the St. Louis Rams, McLeod recorded 82 combined tackles (59 solo), five pass deflections, three forced fumbles, and an interception in 16 games and 16 starts. Pro Football Focus gave McLeod an overall grade of 83.9, which was the 10th highest grade among qualifying safeties and the 9th highest pass coverage grade of 79.8 in 2015.

Philadelphia Eagles

2016
McLeod became an unrestricted free agent after the 2015 season and became one of the top safety prospects on the free agent market. He received interest from multiple teams, including the New York Giants and Baltimore Ravens. McLeod received contract offers from the Philadelphia Eagles, Cleveland Browns, Jacksonville Jaguars, and Tampa Bay Buccaneers.

On March 9, 2016, the Philadelphia Eagles signed McLeod to a five-year, $35 million contract that includes $17 million guaranteed and a signing bonus of $8 million. The contract is worth up to $37 million with incentives, makes McLeod the fourth highest paid safety, and pays him a $7.4 million yearly average salary that is the fourth largest salary among all safeties. The Philadelphia Eagles made McLeod and Malcolm Jenkins the highest paid safety duo in the NFL.

Head coach Doug Pederson named McLeod and Jenkins the starting safeties to begin the regular season. He started the Philadelphia Eagles' season-opener against the Cleveland Browns and recorded four combined tackles and intercepted a pass by quarterback Robert Griffin III in their 29–10 victory. In Week 6, McLeod collected a career-high 14 combined tackles (12 solo) in the Eagles' 27–20 loss at the Washington Redskins. The following week, he recorded seven solo tackles, broke up a pass, made an interception, and his first career sack on Sam Bradford during a 21–10 victory against the Minnesota Vikings. He finished his first season with the Philadelphia Eagles with a career-high 83 combined tackles (72 solo), seven pass deflections, three interceptions, a forced fumble, and a sack in 16 games and 16 starts.

2017
Defensive coordinator Jim Schwartz retained McLeod and Jenkins as the starting safeties and also had Patrick Robinson, Sidney Jones, and Rasul Douglas added to their secondary.

In Week 2, McLeod recorded two combined tackles before leaving the Eagles' 27–20 loss at the Kansas City Chiefs in the second quarter after sustaining a hamstring injury. He missed the following game against the New York Giants and had his 66-game streak as a starter come to an end. He also appeared in every single game since his debut as a rookie in 2012, totaling 82 consecutive games. In Week 8, McLeod recorded four combined tackles, deflected a pass, and an interception in a 33–10 victory against the San Francisco 49ers. On November 19, 2017, he made three combined tackles, broke up a pass, and intercepted a pass by Dak Prescott in the Eagles' 37–9 win at the Dallas Cowboys. McLeod had three consecutive games with an interception for the first time in his career. On December 16, 2017, he collected a season-high 12 combined tackles in a 34–29 win at the New York Giants. McLeod was a healthy scratch in Week 17 and was kept inactive to rest for the playoffs after he sustained a quadriceps injury a few weeks prior. He finished the  season with 54 combined tackles (39 solo), six pass deflections, three interceptions, and a forced fumble in 14 games and 14 starts. Pro Football Focus gave McLeod an overall grade of 79.3, ranking him 39th among all safeties in 2017.

The Philadelphia Eagles finished the 2017 season atop the NFC East with a 13–3 record and clinched a playoff berth and home field advantage. On January 13, 2018, McLeod started his first career playoff game and recorded seven solo tackles and a sack on Matt Ryan during the Eagles' 15–10 victory against the Atlanta Falcons in the NFC Divisional round. The Eagles went on to defeat the Minnesota Vikings in the NFC Championship and went on to face the New England Patriots in the Super Bowl. On February 4, 2018, McLeod started in Super Bowl LII and recorded six combined tackles and broke up a pass in the Eagles' 41–33 victory. McLeod graded out as the 36th best safety by Pro Football Focus in 2017.

2018
On September 29, 2018, McLeod was placed on injured reserve after undergoing surgery to repair a torn MCL he suffered in Week 3 against the Indianapolis Colts.

2019

In the 2019 season, McLeod started all 16 games and had 74 tackles, six pass defenses and two interceptions.

2020

On March 25, 2020, McLeod signed a two-year contract with the Eagles. In Week 8 against the Dallas Cowboys on Sunday Night Football, he scored his second professional touchdown on a 53-yard fumble recovery in the 23–9 victory. On December 10, McLeod was selected as the Eagles' nominee for the Walter Payton Man of the Year Award for 2020. On December 13, 2020, he suffered a torn ACL against the New Orleans Saints, and was subsequently placed on injured reserve, which would end his season. On December 16, 2020, McLeod was placed on injured reserve.

2021
In Week 17 against the Washington Football Team, McLeod made a diving interception in the end zone that sealed the win for the Eagles and, later that day, helped to clinch the Eagles a spot in the playoffs. He was placed on the COVID list on January 3, 2022. He was activated one week later on January 10, missing just one game where the Eagles did not play their starters.

Indianapolis Colts
McLeod signed with the Indianapolis Colts on April 14, 2022.

NFL career statistics

Personal life
In the summer of 2019, Rodney married fellow University of Virginia graduate Erika. The pair launched the Change Our Future charity in the midst of the COVID-19 pandemic and hosted their first annual Sneaker Ball on December 6, 2021.

References

External links
 Indianapolis Colts bio
 Philadelphia Eagles bio
 St. Louis Rams bio

1990 births
Living people
American football safeties
People from Clinton, Maryland
Philadelphia Eagles players
Players of American football from Maryland
Sportspeople from the Washington metropolitan area
St. Louis Rams players
Virginia Cavaliers football players
DeMatha Catholic High School alumni
Indianapolis Colts players
Ed Block Courage Award recipients